Chester A. "Chet" Gerlach (born June 26, 1947) is a retired American educator, lobbyist, and Democratic politician.  He was a member of the Wisconsin State Assembly for five terms, representing Oak Creek and South Milwaukee from 1975 through 1984.  After leaving the Assembly, he worked for many years as a lobbyist to the state government.

Early life and education
Gerlach was born on June 26, 1947, in Milwaukee, Wisconsin.  He graduate from Don Bosco High School and went on to earn his bachelor's degree from St. Norbert College in 1969.  He then received his teaching certification from University of Wisconsin–Milwaukee in 1972 and worked as a teacher.

Career
Gerlach was first elected to the Assembly in 1974, after he defeated incumbent state representative William P. Atkinson in a Democratic Party primary challenge.  He was subsequently re-elected in 1976, 1978, and 1980.  Following the court-ordered redistricting in 1982, he was elected to a fifth term in what was then the 3rd Assembly district.  While serving in the Assembly, he was elected as assistant majority leader for the 1981–1982 session.

Another redistricting occurred in 1983, and rather than running for another term in another new district in 1984, he chose to run in the Democratic primary for an open seat in the Wisconsin State Senate.  He came in a distant 2nd behind John Plewa, who went on to win the general election.

After leaving office, Gerlach spent much of the next 30 years as a political consultant and lobbyist to the state government.  He subsequently moved to Elkhart Lake, in Sheboygan County, Wisconsin, where he retired in 2019.

In 2022, Gerlach chose to come out of retirement to enter the race for Wisconsin State Assembly in the 27th Assembly district, where he was then residing.  The incumbent Republican had chosen not to run for re-election, and there was only one candidate in the race—Republican Amy Binsfeld.  Gerlach chose to run as an independent, on a platform of bipartisan cooperation in Madison.  Binsfeld ultimately prevailed in the 2022 general election with 64% of the vote.

Personal life and family
Chester Gerlach lives with his wife Barbara in Elkhart Lake, Wisconsin.  They have three adult children.

Electoral history

Wisconsin Assembly, 21st district (1974, 1976, 1978, 1980)

| colspan="6" style="text-align:center;background-color: #e9e9e9;"| Democratic Primary, September 10, 1974

| colspan="6" style="text-align:center;background-color: #e9e9e9;"| General Election, November 5, 1974

| colspan="6" style="text-align:center;background-color: #e9e9e9;"| General Election, November 2, 1976

| colspan="6" style="text-align:center;background-color: #e9e9e9;"| General Election, November 7, 1978

| colspan="6" style="text-align:center;background-color: #e9e9e9;"| Democratic Primary, September 9, 1980

| colspan="6" style="text-align:center;background-color: #e9e9e9;"| General Election, November 4, 1980

Wisconsin Assembly, 3rd district (1982)

| colspan="6" style="text-align:center;background-color: #e9e9e9;"| Democratic Primary, September 14, 1982

| colspan="6" style="text-align:center;background-color: #e9e9e9;"| General Election, November 2, 1982

Wisconsin Senate (1984)

| colspan="6" style="text-align:center;background-color: #e9e9e9;"| Democratic Primary, September 11, 1984

Wisconsin Assembly, 27th district (2022)

| colspan="6" style="text-align:center;background-color: #e9e9e9;"| General Election, November 8, 2022

References

1947 births
Living people
Politicians from Milwaukee
People from South Milwaukee, Wisconsin
People from Elkhart Lake, Wisconsin
Democratic Party members of the Wisconsin State Assembly
American lobbyists
St. Norbert College alumni